Muazana "Ana" Golja is a Canadian actress and singer. She is known for playing Zoë Rivas in the teen dramas Degrassi: Next Class and Degrassi: The Next Generation and Ariana Berlin in the TV movie Full Out.

Career
Golja began her acting career in 2005 as Lucy in the Canadian police series 1-800-Missing. She later had small roles in the series Flashpoint and How to Be Indie, before landing a part in the regular cast of Connor Undercover in 2010. In 2011, she played Liz in Clue. In 2010 with What's Up Warthogs! she had her first major role as part of the main cast of that sitcom. She then participated in small projects and a web series before landing the role of Zoë Rivas in the Canadian teen drama Degrassi: Next Class in 2013.

In 2015, Golja played Ariana Berlin, in the TV movie Full Out: The Ariana Berlin Movie, a role which earned her a nomination for the Canadian Screen Awards.

Golja recorded the song "Feel So Good" for the Full Out soundtrack, produced by Roy "Royalty" Hamilton. As of January 2016, Golja was working on her debut EP. She released the EP, titled Epilogue over the course of several weeks in November and December 2017.

Golja co-hosted the Albanian festival Festivali i Këngës 57, the annual Albanian selection for the Eurovision Song Contest, from December 20 to 22, 2018.

Personal life 
Golja was born and raised in Toronto to parents from Albania. She later moved to the Streetsville neighbourhood in Mississauga, Ontario. She is of Albanian descent, and also has "some Spanish, some Greek, some German, and Jewish" heritage. Golja has stated that she considers herself Canadian "through and through".

Filmography

TV roles

Discography
 2015 : Full Out: The Ariana Berlin Movie (Soundtrack)
 2018 : Epilogue (Debut Album)
 2019: Bailemos feat. Alx Veliz (Single)
 2021 : Strive (EP)

Awards and nominations

References

External links 

1996 births
Living people
21st-century Canadian women singers
Actresses from Toronto
Canadian television actresses
Canadian people of Albanian descent
Canadian people of German descent
Canadian people of Greek descent
Canadian people of Jewish descent
Canadian people of Spanish descent
Musicians from Mississauga
Musicians from Toronto